Guillaume II Amanieu de Genève (Guillaume de Gebennis) (died 13 September 1227), Archbishop of Bordeaux (1207-1227) and Seneschal of Gascony (1217-1218) was a 13th century French noble.

Biography
Considered to be descended from the Geniès family, Guillaume was elected in 1207 to the position of Archbishop of Bordeaux. The archbishop and primate of Bourges complained to King Philip II of France, in 1210 about the refusal of Guillaume to accept the jurisdiction of primacy of the Archbishop of Bourges, over the Archbishop of Bordeaux. The matter was raised with Pope Innocent III, who directed action against Guillaume. Guillame was involved in the Reconquista of 1212 with King Alfonso VIII of Castile. In 1217, he was appointed to the office of Seneschal of Gascony, by King Henry III of England, serving until 1218. Guillaume is known to have been in Acre, in the Holy Land in October 1221, as part of the Fifth Crusade and in 1223 at Damietta, Egypt. Travelling to Rome in 1225, he had returned to Angoulême by July 1227. Guillaume were involved in the Albigensian Crusade in 1227, before his death on 13 September 1227.

References
The pontifical France ... chronological and biographical history of the archbishops and bishops of all the dioceses of France. [21 flights. Flight. 1, 2are of the 2nd ed. Honored Jean P. Fisquet, 1864.

Year of birth unknown
1227 deaths
13th-century French people
Medieval French knights
Seneschals of Gascony
Christians of the Fifth Crusade